Paul is a common Latin masculine given name in countries and ethnicities with a Christian heritage (Eastern Orthodoxy, Catholicism, Protestantism) and, beyond Europe, in Christian religious communities throughout the world. Paul – or its variations – can be a given name or surname.

Origin and diffusion 
The name has existed since Roman times. It derives from the Roman family name Paulus or Paullus, from the Latin adjective meaning "small", "humble", "least" or "little" . During the Classical Age it was used to distinguish the minor of two people of the same family bearing the same name. The Roman patrician family of the Gens Aemilia included such prominent persons as Lucius Aemilius Paullus, Lucius Aemilius Paullus Macedonicus, Lucius Aemilius Lepidus Paullus, Tertia Aemilia Paulla (the wife of Scipio Africanus), and Sergius Paulus.

Its prevalence in nations with a Christian heritage is primarily due to its attachment to Saint Paul the Apostle, whose Greek name was Παῦλος, Paûlos, a transliteration from the Latin, also carrying the "modest" meaning of this name, and chosen because of its similarity to his Jewish name Šaul. The name Paul is common, with variations, in all European languages (e.g. English, French, Spanish, Catalan, Portuguese, Italian, German, Dutch, Scandinavian, Greek, Russian, Romanian, Georgian).

Paul's popularity has varied. In the United States, the 1990 census shows it ranked the 13th most common (male) name; however, Social Security Administration data shows popularity in the top 20 until 1968, with steadily declining use until its 2015 rank of 200th.

The feminine versions are Paula, Pauline, Paulina, and Paulette.

Translations 
 Albanian: Pal
 Amharic: ጳውሎስ (P'awlos)
 Latin: Paulus, Paulinus
  (Bulus, in the Bible)
 Aragonese: Pavlo
 Armenian Old: Պաւղոս (Pawłos)
 Armenian Western: Պօղոս (Boġos)
 Armenian Eastern: Պողոս (Poġos)
 Assamese: Pabloo
 Asturian: Pablu
 Basque: Paulo
 Belarusian: Павeл (Pavel), Паўлюк (Paŭluk), Паўлюсь (Paŭluś), Пол (Pol)
 Bengali: পল (Pol)
 Biblical Greek: Paulos or Pavlos
 Biblical Latin: Paulus
 Bosnian: Pavao, Pavão, Pavle
 Breton: Paol
 Bulgarian: Павел (Pavel)
 Catalan: Pau, Pol
 Chinese: 保羅, 保罗 (Bǎoluó), 保祿 (Bǎolù)
 Coptic: ⲡⲁⲩⲗⲟⲥ (Paulos), ⲡⲁⲩⲗⲉ (Paule), ⲡⲁⲩ (Pau)
 Cornish: Pawl
 Corsican: Paulu
 Croatian: Pavao, Pavle, Pavo
 Czech: Pavel
 Danish: Poul, Povl, Palle
 Dutch: Paul, Paulus, Pauwel
 Esperanto: Paŭlo, Paĉjo
 Estonian: Paul, Paavel, Paavo
 Faroese: Páll, Pál, Palli, Pól, Pauli
 Fijian: Paula
 Finnish: Paavali, Paavo, Pauli
 French: Paul, Pol, Paulin
 Frisian: Pouw, Powles, Paulus
 Galician: Paulo
 Georgian: პავლე (Pavle)
 German: Paul
 Greek: Παύλος (Pávlos, Páv̱los)
 Gujarati: પોલ (Pōl)
 Haitian Creole: Pòl
 Hakka: Pó-lò
 Hausa: Bulus
 Hawaiian: Paulo
 Hebrew:  (Paulus – only used in Biblical context)),  (Pol)
 Hindi: पौलुस (pəulus , पौल (pɔl)
 Hungarian: Pál (Nicknames: Pali, Palika, Paja, Pajus, Pajó, Palcsi, Palcsika, Pálka, Palkó, Pálocska)
 Icelandic: Páll
 Indonesian: Paulus
 Irish: Pól, Pódhl
 Italian: Paolo, Paolino
 Japanese:  (Pōru), and in Biblical context,  (Pauro)
 Kannada: ಪಾಲ್ (Pāl)
 Korean: 파울로스 (Paulloseu) or 폴 (Pol)
 Catholic: 바오로 (Baoro)
 Eastern Orthodox: 바울로 (Baullo)
 Protestant: 바울 (Baul), 바우로 (Baulo, Anglican)
 Latin: Paulus
 Latvian: Pauls, Pāvils
 Lithuanian: Paulas, Paulius, Povilas
 Luganda: Paolo
 Malayalam:  പൗലോസ് (Paulose)
 Macedonian:  (Pavle, Pavel)
 Maltese: Pawl, Pawlu
 Manx: Payl
 Māori: Paora
 Marathi: पौलुस (pəulus – only used in Biblical context), पॉल (pɔl), पाव्लो (paʋlo), पाब्लो (pablo)
 Mongolian: Павел (Pavel), Паул
 Na'vi: Pawl
 Nepali: पावलले (Pāvalalē)
 Norwegian: Paul, Pål
 Occitan: Pau
 Old English: Paulus
 Philippine languages: Pablo or Paulo
 Polish: Paweł
 Portuguese: Paulo, Paulino, Paulinho
 Punjabi: ਪੌਲੁਸਨੇ (Paulusanē)
 Romanian: Paul, Pavel
 Russian:  (Pol),  (Pavel),  (Pasha)
 Sardinian: Paulu
 Scottish Gaelic: Pòl, Pàl
 Serbian: Павле (Pavle)
 Shona: Paurosi
 Sicilian: Pàulu, Paulu
 Sinhala: පාවුලු (Pawulu)
 Slovak: Pavol
 Slovene: Pavel
 Spanish: Pablo, Paulino
 Swedish: Paul, Pål
 Syriac: Pawlos, Pola ܦܵܘܠܘܿܣ, ܦܵܘܠܲܐ
 Tamil: பவுல் (Pavul)
 Telugu: పౌలు (Pāulu)
 Thai: พอล (Paul)
 Ukrainian: Павло (Pavlo)
 
 Venetian: Pagolo, Polo
 Vietnamese: Phao-lô
 Welsh: Pawl

Notable examples

Mononym 
 Paul I (disambiguation)
 Paul II (disambiguation)
 Patriarch Paul (disambiguation)
 Pope Paul (disambiguation)
 Saint Paul (disambiguation)
 Paul, Latin Patriarch of Constantinople (died 1371)

A-D 
 Paul, stage name for musician Ray Hildebrand
 Paul Abbott (disambiguation), several people
 Paul Abrahamian, American reality television personality and clothing designer
 Paul Ackerman (1908–1977), American music journalist
 Paul Adado (born 1983), Togolese footballer
 Paul Adelstein (born 1969), American actor and writer
 Paul Adams (disambiguation), several people
 Paul Adamson, British editor and the chairman of Forum Europe and founder of E!Sharp
 Paul Adelstein (born 1969), American actor 
 Paul Affleck (born 1966), Welsh professional golfer
 Paul Agostino (born 1975), Australian former professional footballer 
 Paul Ahmarani (born 1972), Canadian actor
 Paul Ajlouny (born 1933), Palestinian-American publisher and businessman
 Paul Allen (1953–2018), American businessman, co-founder of Microsoft
 Paul Alter (1922–2011), American television director
 Paul America (1944–1982), American actor
 Paul Thomas Anderson (born 1970), American film director and screenwriter
 Paul W. S. Anderson (born 1965), English filmmaker
 Paul Y. Anderson (1893–1938), American journalist
 Paul Martin Andrews (born 1959), American rape survivor
 Paul Anka (born 1941), Canadian singer and songwriter
 Paul Annacone (born 1963), American former touring professional tennis player and current tennis coach
 Paul Anspach (1882–1991), Belgian épée and foil fencer, two-time Olympic champion
 Paul Arcand (born 1960), Canadian radio host
 Paul Ardaji, American film producer
 Paul Armentano, American cannabis activist
 Paul Arnold (disambiguation), several people
 Paul Aron (born 2004), Estonian racing driver
 Paul Ash (1891–1958), German orchestra leader
 Paul Acheampong Cofie Atuahene (born 1923), Ghanaian politician
 Paul Aurelian, 6th-century Welshman who became first bishop of the See of Léon
 Paul Auster (born 1947), American writer and film director
 Paul Atcheson (born 1973), Welsh former international rugby league footballer
 Paul Atkins (cinematographer), American cinematographer and director
 Paul Atkinson (guitarist) (1946–2004), British guitarist and record company executive
 Paul Azinger (born 1960), American professional golfer and TV golf analyst
 Paul Bacon (designer) (1923–2015), American graphic designer
 Paul Bacon (footballer) (born 1970), English footballer
 Paul Bacon (politician) (1907–1999), French politician
 Paul Bales, American director, screenwriter, and producer
 Paul Balmer (born 1970), Swiss mathematician
 Paul Baloche (born 1962), American Christian music artist, worship leader, and singer-songwriter
 Paul Barbarin (1899–1969), American jazz drummer 
 Paul Jean Joseph Barbarin (1855–1931), French mathematician
 Paul Barber, several people
 Paul Barlow, Australian former rules footballer
 Paul Barrere (1948–2019), American musician
 Paul Barresi (born 1949), American actor, movie director, and media personality
 Paul Bartel (1938–2000), American actor, writer and director
 Paul Bates (cricketer) (born 1974), English cricketer
 Paul L. Bates (1908–1995), United States Army officer
 Paul Bateson (born 1940), American former radiographer, convicted murderer, and suspected serial killer
 Paul Batista (born 1948), American television personality, novelist and trial lawyer
 Paul Baum (mathematician) (born 1936), American mathematician
 Paul Bearer (1954–2013), American professional wrestling manager and licensed funeral director
 Paul Beeston (born 1945), Canadian former professional baseball executive
 Paul Benedict (1938–2008), American actor
 Paul K. Benedict (1912–1997), American anthropologist, mental health professional, and linguist 
 Paul Bellini (born 1959), Canadian comedy writer and television actor 
 Paul Benjamin (1938–2019), American actor and playwright
 Paul Ben-Victor (born 1965), American actor
 Paul Bern (1889–1932), German-born American film director, screenwriter, and producer
 Paul Bernardo (born 1964), Canadian serial killer and rapist
 Paul Berthon (1872–1910), French artist
 Paul Émile Berton (1846–1909), French landscape painter
 Paul Bertrand (1879–1944), French paleobotanist
 Paul Bettany (born 1971), English actor
 Paul Bilzerian (born 1950), American businessman
 Paul Biya (born 1933), Cameroonian politician
 Paul Blackburn (disambiguation), several people
 Paul Blackthorne (born 1969), English actor
 Paul Bley (1932–2016), Canadian jazz pianist
 Paul Blomfield (born 1953), British politician
 Paul Bocuse (1926–2018), French chef
 Paul Boesch (1912–1989), American professional wrestler and promoter
 Paul Vanden Boeynants (1919–2001), Belgian politician
 Paul Bollenback (born 1959), American jazz guitarist
 Paul Bonga Bonga (born 1933), Congolese footballer 
 Paul Bonner, British fantasy artist
 Paul Hyde Bonner (1893–1968), American banker, soldier, singer, diplomat, and author
 Paul Bonwick (born 1964), lobbyist and former politician in Canada
 Paul-Émile Borduas (1905–1960), Québecois artist
 Paul Bostaph (born 1964), American heavy metal drummer
 Paul Bosvelt (born 1970), Dutch football coach and former professional footballer
 Paul H. Boucher (1931–2003), American city manager
 Paul Bowman (rugby league) (born 1976), Australian former professional rugby league footballer
 Paul Bowser (1886–1960), American professional wrestling promoter
 Paul Boyd (animator) (1967–2007), American-born Canadian animator
 Paul D. Boyer (1918–2018), American biochemist, Nobel prize winner
 Paul-André Brasseur (born 1994), Canadian actor
 Paul Breitner (born 1951), German international footballer
 Paul Breyne (born 1947), Belgian politician
 Paul Brickhill (1916–1991), Australian fighter pilot
 Paul Briggs, several people
 Paul Bristow (born 1979), British politician
 Paul Brodie (1934–2007), Canadian saxophonist
 Paul Brophy (1937–1986), American firefighter
 Paul Brooke (born 1944), English actor of film, television and radio
 Paul Brooker (born 1976), English retired professional football winger
 Paul Brown (1908–1991), American football coach, team owner, and executive
 Paul Brown (disambiguation), several people
 Paul Bryan (musician) (born 1967), American musician
 Paul Bryan (politician) (1913–2004), British politician
 Paul Bryar (1910–1985), American actor
 Paul Bryers (born 1955), British film director, screenwriter, and fiction author
 Paul Buckmaster (1946–2017), English Grammy Award-winning English cellist, arranger, conductor and composer
 Paul Burchill (born 1979), English professional wrestler
 Paul Burgess (musician) (born 1950), English rock drummer
 Paul Burmeister (born 1971), American Sportscaster with NBC Sports and NBC Olympics
 Paul Burstow (born 1962), British former politician 
 Paul Butcher (actor) (born 1994), American actor and singer
 Paul Butcher (American football) (born 1963), American football linebacker
 Paul Butler (polo) (1892–1981), American heir, businessman and polo player
 Paul Bunyan, a giant lumberjack and folk hero in American and Canadian folklore whose existence is disputed
 Paul Calderón, Puerto Rican actor, writer, director and producer
 Paul Johnson Calderon, American writer, television personality and socialite 
 Paul Callaghan (1947–2012), New Zealand physicist
 Paul Callaghan (Gaelic footballer) (born 1971), Irish Gaelic football coach and former goalkeeper
 Paul Callan (1939–2020), British journalist and editor
 Paul Cameron (disambiguation), several people
 Paul Campbell (disambiguation), several people
 Paul Cantelon (born 1959), American contemporary classical music composer
 Paul Carafotes (born 1959), American actor
 Paul Carey (ice hockey) (born 1988), American professional ice hockey center player
 Paul Carney (1943–2015), judge of the Irish High Court
 Paul Carney (British Army officer) (born 1979), senior British Army soldier
 Paul Carr (actor) (1934–2006), American actor, director, writer, and producer 
 Paul Carrack (born 1951), English singer, musician, songwriter and composer
 Paul Casey (disambiguation), several people
 Paul Cavanagh (1888–1964), English film and stage actor
 Paul Cavonis (born 1937), American actor
 Paul Cebar (born 1956), American songwriter, singer, guitarist and bandleader
 Paul Cézanne (1839–1906), French artist and Post-Impressionist painter
 Paul A. Chamberlain, United States Army lieutenant general
 Paul Chamberlain (born 1954), Canadian philosopher and professor
 Paul Chamberlin (born 1962), American former professional tennis player
 Paul Chan (disambiguation), several people
 Paul Channon (1935–2007), British Conservative MP
 Paul Joseph Chartier (1921–1966), Canadian man who died from a bomb that he was setting off
 Paul Chiang (born 1960), Canadian politician
 Paul Chivers, American man who has been missing since 1999
 Paul Christopher (born 1971), French politician
 Paul Christie (disambiguation), several people
 Paul Chitlik, American author, television and film writer, producer, and director
 Paul Chubb (1949–2002), Australian film, television and stage actor
 Paul Chun (born 1945), Hong Kong actor
 Paul Clayton (actor) (born 1957), English actor, director and author
 Paul Clohessy (born 1970), Australian vision impaired tandem cyclist
 Paul Coffee (born 1956), American soccer goalkeeper
 Paul Coffey (disambiguation), several people
 Paul Collier (activist) (1964–2010), Australian disability activist
 Paul Cook (disambiguation), several people
 Paul Copley (born 1944), English actor and voiceover artist
 Paul Cornu (1881–1944), French engineer
 Paul Costello (1894–1986), American triple Olympic Gold Medal winner
 Paul Costelloe (born 1945), Irish designer and artist
 Paul Coyne (born 1964), American film and television editor and producer
 Paul Craft (1938–2014), American singer-songwriter
 Paul Craig (disambiguation), several people
 Paul Crampel (1864–1891), French explorer and murder victim
 Paul Creston (born 1906–1985), Italian American composer of classical music
 Paul Christy (1939–2021), American professional wrestler
 Paul W. Cronin (1938–1997), one-term congressman of the U.S. House of Representatives 
 Paul Crosby (criminal) (born 19??), Irish criminal
 Paul Crossley (pianist) (born 1944), British pianist
 Paul Crouch (activist) (1903–1955), communist activist
 Paul Crouch (1934–2013), American television evangelist
 Paul Crouch Jr. (born 1959), American Christian broadcaster
 Paul Crowley (ice hockey) (born 1955), Canadian former professional ice hockey player
 Paul Crutzen (1933–2021), Dutch meteorologist, Nobel prize winner
 Paul Cunniffe (1961–2001), British-born, Irish singer-songwriter
 Paul Curran, several people
 Paul Curry (born 1961), English golfer
 Paul Daley (born 1983), British mixed martial artist and kickboxer
 Paul Dana (1975–2006), American racing driver
 Paul Dano (born 1984), American actor and filmmaker
 Paul Dacre (born 1948), English journalist 
 Paul-Henri Sandaogo Damiba, military officer and former president of Burkina Faso
 Paul D'Amour (born 1967), American musician
 Paul Danan (born 1978), English actor 
 Paul Darrow (1941–2019), English actor
 Paul Davids, American independent filmmaker and writer
 Paul Davies (disambiguation), several people
 Paul Davis (disambiguation), several people
 Paul Dehn (1912–1976), British screenwriter
 Paul DeJong (born 1993), American baseball player
 Paul Michael DelVecchio Jr. (born 1980), known by Pauly D and DJ Pauly D, American television personality and DJ
 Paul Derringer (1906–1987), American Major League Baseball right-handed pitcher 
 Paul Delph (1957–1996), Los Angeles-based singer, songwriter, producer, engineer, and studio musician
 Paul Desmond (1924–1977), American jazz saxophonist and composer
 Paul Dessau (1894–1979), German composer and conductor
 Paul Lucien Dessau (1909–1999), British artist
 Paul Dewar (1963–2019), Canadian educator and politician
 Paul Diamond (born 1961), Croatian professional wrestler
 Paul S. Diamond (born 1953), United States District Judge
 Paul DiMeo (born 1958), American television personality
 Paul Dinello (born 1962), American comedian, actor, and writer
 Paul Dini (born 1957), American screenwriter and comic creator
 Paul Dirac (1902–1984), English physicist and Nobel-prize winner
 Paul Dobson, several people
 Paul Dooley (born 1928), American actor
 Paul Dooley (footballer) (born 1975), Australian rules footballer
 Paul Driessen (animator) (born 1940), Dutch film director, animator and writer
 Paul Dukas (1865–1935), French composer
 Paul Dunlap (1919–2010), American composer
 Paul Durant (born 1959), American racecar driver
 Paul Durousseau (born 1970), American serial killer

E-K 
 Paul Eberle, American author
 Paul Eddington (1927–1995), English actor
 Paul Edwards (philosopher) (1923–2004), Austrian-American moral philosopher
 Paul Ehrenfest (1880–1933), Austrian-Dutch theoretical physicist
 Paul Ehrlich (disambiguation), several people
 Paul Eiding (born 1957), American actor and instructor
 Paul Ellering (born 1953), American professional wrestling manager, professional wrestler and dog musher
 Paul J. Ellison (1940–1988), American politician
 Paul Engelmann (1891–1965), Viennese architect 
 Paul Erdős (1913–1996), Hungarian mathematician
 Paul Fanaika (born 1986), American football offensive guard.
 Paul Farmer (1959–2022), American medical anthropologist and physician
 Paul S. Farmer, British retired educationalist 
 Paul Feig (born 1962), American actor, comedian and filmmaker
 Paul Felder (born 1984), American professional mixed martial artist and color commentator for UFC
 Paul Fenech (born 1972), Australian filmmaker, film and television actor, director, producer and writer
 Paul Fenech (footballer) (born 1986), footballer who plays for Maltese Premier League
 Paul Ferguson (born 1955), Church of England bishop
 Paul Ferguson (born 1958), English rock drummer
 Paul Fernando (1951–2020), Sri Lankan Sinhala baila vocalist
 Paul Johann Anselm Ritter von Feuerbach (1775–1833), German legal scholar
 Paul Feyerabend (1924–1994), Austrian-born philosopher of science 
 Paul Finebaum, American sports author, television and radio personality, and former columnist
 Paul Fischer (disambiguation), several people
 Paul Fisher (disambiguation), several people
 Paul Fix (1901–1983), American film and television character actor 
 Paul Fix (racing driver), American racecar driver
 Paul Flatley (born 1941), American former football wide receiver
 Paul Foot (comedian) (born 1973), English comedian
 Paul Foot (journalist) (1937–2004), British investigative journalist, political campaigner and author
 Paul Forman (born 1937), historian of science 
 Paul Foshee (1932–2020), American politician
 Paul Christian Frank (1879–1956), Norwegian barrister, politician, organizer and non-fiction writer
 Paul Frank (born 1967), American cartoonist, artist and fashion designer
 Paul Franklin, several people
 Paul Frappier (1977–2011), Canadian musician known as "Bad News Brown"
 Paul Frees (1920–1986), American actor, comedian, impressionist and vaudevillian
 Paul Freeman (disambiguation), several people
 Paul French, several people
 Paul Friedberg (born 1959), American Olympic fencer
 Paul Fronczak (1964–2020), American kidnapped victim
 Paul Fry (disambiguation), several people
 Paul Fusco (born 1953), American puppeteer, actor, television producer, writer and director
 Paul Fusco (photographer) (1930–2020), American photojournalist
 Paul Francis Gadd (born 1944), English former singer, songwriter, and record producer whose stage name is "Gary Glitter"
 Paul Galloway (1934–2009), American newspaper reporter, columnist and storyteller 
 Paul Vernon Galloway (1904–1990), American United Methodist minister 
 Paul Gambaccini (born 1949), American-British radio and television presenter
 Paul Gangelin (1898–1961), American screenwriter
 Paul Gascoigne (born 1967), English footballer
 Pau Gasol (born 1980), Spanish former professional basketball player
 Paul Gauguin (1848–1903), French painter
 Paul Geidel (1894–1987), longest-serving prison inmate in the United States
 Paul Gentilozzi (born 1950), American race car driver and businessman
 Paul George (disambiguation), several people
 Paul Giamatti (born 1967), American actor
 Paul Gilley (1929–1957), American country music lyricist and promoter
 Paul Gilligan (judge) (born 1948), Irish judge
 Paul Michael Glaser (born 1943), American actor
 Paul Glass (born 1934), Swiss-American composer
 Paul Gleason (1939–2006), American film and television actor
 Paul Gleeson (magician) (born 1987), Irish TV magician, mentalist and escapologist
 Paul Gleeson (tennis) (1880–1956), American tennis player
 Paul Roland Gogo (born 1965), known as Gogo, Canadian rock-and-roll keyboard player, and multi-instrumentalist
 Paul Goldschmidt (born 1987), American baseball player
 Paul Goldstein (law professor) (born 1943), American law professor at Stanford Law School
 Paul Goldstein (tennis) (born 1976), American tennis player
 Paul Gorman (disambiguation), several people
 Paul Gosar (born 1958), American politician 
 Paul Götze (1903–1948), Nazi SS officer at Auschwitz and Buchenwald concentration camps executed for war crimes
 Paul Guermonprez (1908–1944), photographer, graphic designer, Dutch resistance member in World War II
 Paul Guilfoyle (born 1949), American television and film actor
 Paul Guilfoyle (actor, born 1902) (died 1964), American stage, film and television actor
 Paul Grabowsky (born 1958), Australian pianist and composer
 Paul Graham, several people
 Paul Grant, several people
 Paul Gratzik (1935–2018), German dramatist and novelist
 Paul Gray (American musician) (1972–2010), American musician
 Paul Greco (1955–2008), American actor and musician
 Paul Greene (athlete) (born 1972), Australian professional musician and former athlete
 Paul Green (musician) (born 1972), American record producer
 Paul Greengrass (born 1955), British film director, film producer, screenwriter and former journalist
 Paul Griffin (musician) (1937–2000), American pianist and session musician
 Paul Griggs (born 1944), British musician
 Paul Grilley (born 1958), American teacher of modern yoga
 Paul Guihard (1932–1962), British journalist and murder victim
 Paul Guilfoyle (actor, born 1902) (died 1961), American stage, film and television actor
 Paul Guilfoyle (born 1949), American television and film actor
 Paul Gulacy (born 1953), American comics artist
 Paul Haarhuis (born 1966), Dutch tennis player
 Paul Ben-Haim (1897–1984), Israeli composer
 Paul Haggis (born 1953), Canadian screenwriter and film producer
 Paul Hall (labor leader) (1914–1980), American labor leader
 Paul Halley (born 1952), English keyboardist, vocalist and composer
 Paul Halmos (1916–2006), Hungarian-born American mathematician and statistician
 Paul A Hampton (born 1970), American musician, songwriter, and producer
 Paul Hampton (born 1937), American actor, singer, lyricist and writer
 Paul G. Hahnemann (1912–1997), leading director at BMW between 1961 and 1972
 Paul David Harbour (born 1965), American bass guitar and guitar player, pianist and composer
 Paul Hardy (disambiguation)
 Paul D. Harkins (1904–1984), United States Army officer and general
 Paul Harrison (disambiguation), several people
 Paul Harrod, American animation director, production designer, and art director
 Paul Harvey (disambiguation), several people
 Paul Harpur (born 1979), Australian twice-Paralympian
 Paul Walter Hauser (born 1986), American actor and comedian
 Paul Hawken (born 1946), American environmentalist
 Paul Hawksbee, British sports radio presenter and comedy writer
 Paul Hecht (born 1941), English-born Canadian stage, film, and television actor
 Paul Hellyer (1923–2021), Canadian engineer, politician, writer, and commentator
 Paul Hendy (born 1966), British script-writer, novelist, director, producer and filmmaker
 Paul Henderson (disambiguation), several people
 Paul Henning (1911–2005), American TV producer and screenwriter
 Paul Herman (disambiguation), several people
 Paul Hermann (disambiguation), several people
 Paul Herrmann (born 1985), German short-track speed-skater
 Paul Hewson (born 1960), known by his stage name Bono, Irish singer of U2
 Paul Hertzog, American film composer and educator
 Paul M. Herzog (1906–1986), American lawyer, educator, civil servant, and university administrator
 Paul Heyman (born 1965), American entertainment executive and performer
 Paul Heyse (1830–1914), German writer and translator
 Paul Hill, several people
 Paul Jennings Hill (1954–2003), American minister executed for murder
 Paul Hindemith (1895–1963), German composer
 Paul von Hindenburg (1847–1934), German field marshal and statesman
 Paul Hilton, several people
 Paul Hinder, bishop from Abu Dhabi
 Paul Hogan (born 1939), Australian actor and comedian
 Paul Hogan (disambiguation), several people
 Paul Hollywood (born 1966), English celebrity chef and television presenter
 Paul Holmes (broadcaster) (1950–2013), New Zealand broadcaster
 Paul Homan (1893–1969), American economist
 Paul Hoover (disambiguation), several people
 Paul A. Hopper  (born 1956), Australian bioentrepreneur
 Paul Hopper, American linguist
 Paul Hornsby, American musician and record producer
 Paul Horn (computer scientist) (born 1946), American computer scientist and solid state physicist
 Paul Horn (musician) (1930–2014), American flautist, saxophonist, composer and producer
 Paul Hornung (1935–2020), American professional football player
 Paul Humphries (born 1965), former English cricketer
 Paul Humphrey (disambiguation), several people
 Paul Humphreys (disambiguation), several people
 Paul Hunt (disambiguation), several people
 Paul Hurry (born 1975), British international motorcycle speedway rider
 Paul Iacono (born 1988), American actor
 Paul Ince (born 1967), English international footballer
 Paul Ireland (born 1970), Scottish actor
 Paul D. Irving (born 1957), American law enforcement officer
 Paul Irwin, American nonprofit executive, president and CEO of Elephants in Crisis
 Pavlo Ishchenko (born 1992), Ukrainian-Israeli boxer
 Paul Jabara (1948–1992), American actor, singer, and songwriter
 Paul Jack (born 1965), Malaysian former professional footballer
 Paul Janes (1912–1987), German football player
 Paul Jans (born 1981), Dutch professional footballer who plays as a striker for De Treffers
 Paul Janson (1840–1913), Walloon Belgian liberal politician
 Paul Janssen (1926–2003), Belgian pharmacologist, founder of Janssen Pharmaceutica
 Paul Janz (born 1951), Canadian theologian
 Paul Jaques, British Army officer
 Paul Jaworski (1900–1929), American bank robber
 Paul Jeffreys (1952–1988), English rock musician
 Paul Jennings (disambiguation), several people
 Paul Marshall Johnson Jr. (1955–2004), American helicopter engineer and murder victim
 Paul Jones (disambiguation), several people
 Paul Kagame (born 1957), President of Rwanda
 Paul Kalkbrenner (born 1977), German musician, producer of electronic music and actor
 Paul Kandel (born 1951), American musical theatre actor and tenor singer 
 Paul Kanjorski (born 1937), American politician 
 Paul Kantner (1941–2016), American rock musician
 Paul Karason (1950–2013), American man with argyria
 Paul Kariya (born 1974), Canadian former professional ice hockey winger
 Paul Kasey (born 1973), English actor
 Paul Kavanagh, several people
 Paul Kaye (disambiguation). several people
 Paul Keating (born 1944), Australian Prime Minister
 Paul F. Keene Jr. (1920–2009), Philadelphia-area artist and teacher
 Paul Kenneth Keller (born 1966), American serial arsonist and convicted murderer
 Paul Kemp, several people
 Paul Kemprecos (born 1939), American writer
 Paul Keres (1916–1975), Estonian chess grandmaster and chess writer
 Paul Kersey (actor) (born 1970), American actor
 Paul Kirby (born 1966), Australian politician
 Paul Klee (1879–1940), Swiss-German painter
 Paul Klenerman (born 1963), British Olympic sabre fencer
 Paul John Knowles (1946–1974), American serial killer and rapist
 Paul Knutsen, Norwegian seaman who disappeared in 1919
 Paul Konchesky (born 1981), English football coach and former professional player
 Paul Konerko (born 1976), American former professional baseball player
 Paul Korver (born 1971), American entrepreneur, filmmaker, and producer
 Paul Koslo (1944–2019), German-born Canadian actor
 Paul Kossoff (1950–1976), English guitarist
 Paul J. Kramer (1904–1995), American biologist and plant physiologist
 Paul Kramer (1933–2020), American Republican Party politician
 Paul Krassner (1932–2019), American author, journalist, and comedian
 Paul Kreppel (born 1947), American actor and director
 Paul Kruger (1825–1904), President of the South African Republic
 Paul Krugman (born 1953), Nobel Prize-winning American economist and writer
 Paul Kurtz (1925–2012), American scientific skeptic and secular humanist
 Paul Kurtz (died 167?), German goldsmith

L-R 
 Paul Laffoley (1935–2015), American visionary artist and architect
 Paul de Lamerie (1688–1751), London-based silversmith
 Paul Langlois (musician), Canadian musician
 Paul Henry Lang (1901–1991), Hungarian-American musicologist and music critic
 Paul Langlois (politician) (1926–2012), member of Canadian Parliament
 Paul Langton (1913–1980), American actor
 Paul Larkins (born 1963) is a English retired middle-distance runner
 Paul of Latrus (died c. 956), Greek hermit
 Paul Lazarus, American director, producer and writer of film, television and theatre
 Paul Lekakis (born 1966), American actor, model, and filmmaker 
 Paul Le Mat (born 1945), American actor
 Paul Lemerle (1903–1989), French Byzantinist
 Paul Leni (1885–1929), German filmmaker
 Paul LePage (born 1948), American politician and businessman
 Paul Le Roux (born 1972), African former programmer, former criminal cartel boss, and informant to the US Drug Enforcement Administration (DEA)
 Paul Levesque (born 1969), American wrestler better known as "Triple H"
 Paul Lincke (1866–1946), German composer and theater conductor
 Paul Linke (born 1948), American actor
 Paul Logan (actor) (born 1973), American actor, model, martial artist, stuntman, producer and screenwriter
 Paul London (born 1980), American professional wrestler and actor
 Paul London (singer), Canadian singer
 Paul F. Lorence (1955–1986), American weapon systems officer
 Paul Lucas, several people
 Paul Lukas (1894–1971), Hungarian actor
 Paul Lukas (journalist), American sports writer
 Paul Lynch (politician), Australian member of the New South Wales Legislative Assembly 
 Paul Lynch (writer) (born 1977), Irish writer
 Paul Lynde (1926–1982), American comedian, actor and game show panelist
 Paul Madeley (1944–2018), English footballer
 Paul Magès (1908–1999), French inventor of the first self-leveling automobile suspension, known as hydro-pneumatic suspension
 Paul Magloire (1907–2001), Haitian president from 1950 to 1956
 Paul Maguire (born 1938), American professional football player and television sportscaster
 Paul Maguire (footballer) (born 1956), Scottish former footballer
 Paul Maguire (judge) (born 1952), British Appeal Court judge
 Paul Makler Jr. (born 1946), American Olympic fencer, son of Paul Makler Sr.
 Paul Makler Sr. (1920–2022), American Olympic fencer
 Paul Maloney (disambiguation), several people
 Paul Manafort (born 1949), American lobbyist, political consultant, lawyer and convicted fraudster
 Paul Manly, Canadian politician
 Paul Marcus (1954–2011), BAFTA winning British television director and producer
 Paul Marks (disambiguation), several people
 Paul Martin (born 1938), Canadian former prime minister
 Paul Martin (disambiguation), several people
 Paul Martini (born 1960), Canadian former pair skater
 Paul Marque (born 1997), French ballet dancer
 Paul Marquess (born 1964), Irish television producer
 Paul Marquis (born 1972), English former football defender
 Paul Mauriat (1925–2006), French orchestra leader
 Paul Maurice (born 1967), Canadian former ice hockey player and coach
 Paul Mazursky (1930–2014), American film director
 Paul McCartney (born 1942), English singer and musician; member of The Beatles
 Paul McCobb (1917–1969), American furniture designer
 Paul McCrane (born 1961), American film, television and theatre actor
 Paul McGann (born 1959), English actor
 Paul McGill (actor) (born 1987), American actor, choreographer and director for stage, film, and television
 Paul McGillion, Scottish actor
 Paul McGinley (born 1966), Irish professional golfer
 Paul McGonagle (1939–1974), Irish-American mobster
 Paul C. McKasty (1964–1989), better known as Paul C, East Coast hip hop pioneer, producer, engineer, and mixer
 Paul McLoone (born 1967), Irish musician
 Paul McRae (1924–1992), Liberal party member of the House of Commons of Canada
 Paul McShane (footballer) (born 1986), Irish football player
 Paul McShane (rugby league) (born 1989), rugby league footballer
 Paul Meany (born 1976), American singer-songwriter
 Paul Menard (born 1980), American racing driver, son of Menards founder John Menard Jr
 Paul Menard (ice hockey) (born 1952), Canadian former professional ice hockey goaltender
 Paul Mecurio American comedian, actor, writer and producer
 Paul Mercurio (born 1963), Australian actor, dancer, TV presenter and politician
 Paul Merriman, Canadian politician
 Paul Merson (born 1968), English former professional footballer, manager, commentator and sports television pundit
 Paul Merton (born 1957), English writer, actor, comedian and radio and television presenter
 Paul Mescal (born 1996), Irish actor
 Paul Métivier (1900–2004), Canadian veterans of the First World War
 Paul Redmond Michel (born 1941), United States Circuit Judge
 Paul Millsap (born 1985), American basketball player
 Paul Molitor (born 1956), American baseball player
 Paul Morand (1888–1976), French author
 Paul Morphy (1837–1884), American chess player
 Paul S. Morton (born 1950), American Baptist pastor
 Paul Moskau (born 1953), American former Major League Baseball pitcher
 Paul Motian (1931–2011), American jazz drummer, percussionist, and composer
 Paul Muni (1895–1967), Austro-Hungarian American stage and film actor
 Paul Murphy (disambiguation), several people
 Paul Naschy (1934–2009), Spanish film actor, screenwriter, and director
 Paul Nash, several people
 Paul Nassif (born 1962), American plastic surgeon and television personality
 Paul Nehlen (born 1969), American businessman
 Paul Neu (born 1966), American professional wrestler known as "P. N. News"
 Paul Newman (1925–2008), American actor and philanthropist
 Paul Ngei (1923–2004), Kenyan politician
 Paul Nicklen (born 1968), Canadian photographer, film-maker, author and marine biologist
 Paul Nipkow (1860–1940), German inventor
 Paul Nitz, American paralympic athlete
 Paul Noble (born 1963), British visual artist 
 Paul Alexander Nolan, Canadian actor
 Paul V. Nolan, member of the Tennessee House of Representatives
 Paul Noonan, Irish songwriter, vocalist and multi-instrumentalist
 Paul Norris (1914–2007), American comic book artist
 Paul Norris (visual effects), British visual effects supervisor
 Paul Norton (musician) (born 1961), Australian singer-songwriter and guitarist
 Paul Novotny (born 1965/1966), American politician
 Paul Oakenfold (born 1963), English DJ and electronic musician
 Paul Ogorzow (1912–1941), German serial killer and rapist
 Paul O'Grady (disambiguation), several people
 Paul O'Halloran (born 1950), Australian politician
 Paul Okon (born 1972), Australian football manager and player
 Paul (Olmari) (1914–1988), head of the Orthodox Church of Finland
 Paul Orndorff (1949–2021), American professional wrestler
 Paul Otlet (1868–1944), Belgian author and peace activist, father of information science
 Paul Overby (born 1942), American author
 Paul Pairet (born 1964), French chef
 Paul G. Pearson (1926–2000), American academic
 Paul Pedersen (composer) (born 1935), Canadian composer, arts administrator, and music educator
 Paul Pedersen (disambiguation)
 Paul Le Person (1931–2005), French actor
 Paul Petersen (born 1945), American actor, singer, novelist, and activist
 Paul Pelosi (born 1940), American businessman
 Paul Perera (1929–2007), Sri Lankan Sinhala politician and lawyer
 Paul Peters, several people
 Paul Peterson (disambiguation), several people
 Paul Pierce (born 1977), American basketball player
 Paul Picerni (1922–2011), American film and television actor
 Paul St-Pierre Plamondon (born 1977), Canadian lawyer, television columnist and politician
 Paul Pogba (born 1993), French footballer
 Paul Poiret (1879–1944), French fashion designer
 Paul Pons (1864–1915), French wrestler
 Paul Poom (born 1958), Estonian actor
 Paul Popovich (born 1940), American former professional baseball infielder
 Paul Popowich, Canadian actor
 Paul Posluszny (born 1984), American football linebacker
 Paul Potts (born 1970), English tenor
 Paul Potts (writer) (1911–1990), British-born poet 
 Paul Warner Powell (1978–2010), American murderer
 Paul Préboist (1927–1997), French actor
 Paul Pressler (politician) (born 1930), retired justice of the Texas 14th Circuit Court of Appeals
 Paul Quantrill (born 1968), Canadian former professional baseball right-handed relief pitcher
 Paul Quarrington (1953–2010), Canadian novelist, playwright, screenwriter, filmmaker, musician and educator
 Paul Quassa (born 1952), Canadian politician who served as the fourth premier of Nunavut
 Paul Quessenberry (born 1992), American football tight end
 Paul Quinn (c. 1986–2007), Irish murder victim
 Paul Rabil (born 1985), American professional lacrosse player
 Paul Ramsey (politician), Canadian academic and politician
 Paul Ready (born 1977), British actor
 Paul Ré (born 1950), American artist, writer, poet and peace advocate
 Paul Reclus (anarchist) (1858–1941), French anarchist
 Paul Reclus (1847–1914), French physician specializing in surgery
 Paul Redfarn (born 1963), English cricketer
 Paul Redfern (disappeared 1927), American musician and pilot
 Paul Rée (1849–1901), German author, physician, and philosopher
 Paul Reed (disambiguation), several people
 Paul Reinhart (born 1960), Canadian former professional ice hockey defenceman
 Paul Reiser (born 1957), American comedian
 Paul Reubens (born 1952), American comedian known for playing Pee-wee Herman
 Paul Reuter (disambiguation), several people
 Paul Revere (1735–1818), patriot of the American Revolution and silversmith
 Paul Rhoads (born 1967), American college football coach
 Paul Ezra Rhoades (1957–2011), American spree killer and suspected serial killer
 Paul Rhodes (born 1956), Canadian political strategist
 Paul Richardson (American football) (born 1992), American former football wide receiver
 Paul Riser (born 1943), American trombonist and Motown musical arranger
 Paul G. Risser (1939–2014), American ecologist and academic
 Paul Ritchie (footballer, born 1975), Scottish football coach and former professional player
 Paul Ritter (disambiguation), several people
 Paul Roach (born 1927), American former football player, coach, and college athletics administrator
 Paul Craig Roberts (born 1939), American economist and author
 Paul Roberts (disambiguation), several people
 Paul Robeson (1898–1976), American actor, singer and activist
 Paul Roche (1916–2007), British poet, novelist, and professor of English
 Paul Roche (hurler) (born 1982), Irish sportsperson
 Paul Rodgers (born 1949), English musician/songwriter, singer in Free and Bad Company
 Paul Rodriguez (actor) (born 1955), Mexican-American actor
 Paul Rodriguez (skateboarder) (born 1984), American professional street skateboarder, actor, rapper, and recording artist
 Paul Rohmer (1876–1977), Alsacian physician
 Paul Romanuk (born 1961), Toronto sportscaster and writer
 Paul Roma (born 1960), American professional wrestler
 Paul Romer (born 1955), American economist and policy entrepreneur
 Paul Rooney, several people
 Paul Rosche (1934–2016), German engineer
 Paul Rose, several people
 Paul Rosen (born 1960), Canadian ice sledge hockey goalie
 Paul M. Rosen, American attorney and government official
 Paul Rosenberg (music manager) (born 1971), American music manager
 Paul Rudd (born 1969), American actor
 Paul Rudd (DJ) (born 1979), English house music DJ
 Paul Ryan Rudd (1940–2010), American actor known for theater work
 Paul Rudnick (born 1957), American writer
 Paul Rugg (born 1960), American screenwriter, producer, voice actor, and puppeteer
 Paul Rugg (cricketer) (born 1978), New Zealander cricketer
 Paul Runge (serial killer) (born 1970), American serial killer
 Paul Ryan (disambiguation), several people

S-Z 
 Paul Sabu (born 1960), American singer, songwriter, producer, and guitarist
 Paul Sacher (1906–1999), Swiss conductor, patron and billionaire businessperson
 Paul Salas (born 1998), Filipino actor, model, and vlogger
 Paul Samuelson (1915–2009), Nobel Prize-winning American economist
 Paul Sanchez, American guitarist and a singer-songwriter
 Paul Sanchez (bishop) (born 1946), American prelate of the Roman Catholic Church
 Paul Sand (born 1932), American actor and comedian
 Paul M. Sand (1914–1984), American attorney and jurist
 Paul Sarbanes (1933–2020), American politician and attorney
 Paul Sass (born 1988), English retired mixed martial artist 
 Paul Satterfield (born 1960), American actor
 Paul Sauvé (1907–1960), Canadian lawyer, World War II veteran, and politician and the 17th premier of Quebec in 1959 and 1960
 Paul Sauvé (curler) (1939–2020), Canadian curler
 Paul Schäfer (1921–2010), German-Chilean Christian minister
 Paul Schaffer (1924–2020), Austrian-born French Holocaust survivor
 Paul Schenck (born 1958), American pastoral practitioner, author and lecturer
 Paul F. Schenck (1899–1968), American educator and politician
 Paul Schenk (1899–1977), German music theorist
 Paul Scheuring (born 1968), American screenwriter and director of films and television shows
 Paul Schibli, Canadian animator, storyboard artist, director, and painter
 Paul Felix Schmidt (1916–1984), Estonian and German chess player, writer and chemist
 Paul Scholes (born 1974), England international footballer
 Paul Scofield (1922–2008), English actor
 Paul Scott (novelist) (1920–1978), English novelist
 Paul Scully (born 1968), British politician
 Paul Scully, Australian politician
 Paul Sereno (born 1957), American paleontologist
 Paul Sewald (born 1990), American baseball player
 Paul Shaffer (born 1949), Canadian singer, composer, actor, author, comedian, and multi-instrumentalist 
 Paul R. Shaffer (1930–1975), United States military aide
 Paul Shane (1940–2013), British actor and comedian
 Paul Shenar (1936−1989), American actor and theater director
 Paul Signac (1863–1935), French Neo-Impressionist painter
 Paul Silas (1943–2022), American professional basketball player and head coach 
 Paul Simon (born 1941), American musician
 Paul Simon (disambiguation), several people
 Paul E. Simons, U.S. diplomat
 Paul Simonon (born 1955), English rock bassist, most notably of the Clash
 Paul Siple (1908–1968), American Antarctic explorer and geographer 
 Paul Symon (born 1960), Director-General of the Australian Secret Intelligence Service
 Paul Skiba (born 1960), American man who went missing in 1999
 Paul Badura-Skoda (1927–2019), Austrian pianist
 Paul Smith (disambiguation), several people
 Paul Snider (1951–1980), Canadian nightclub promoter, pimp, and murderer
 Paul Soles (1930–2021), Canadian voice actor
 Paul Solman (born 1944), American journalist
 Paul Sorrento (born 1965), American baseball player and coach
 Paul Sorvino (1939–2022), American actor
 Paul Stanford, American founder of The Hemp and Cannabis Foundation
 Paul Stanley (born 1952), American musician and co-founder of the band Kiss
 Paul Stanley (disambiguation)
 Paul Stastny (born 1985), Canadian-American ice hockey player
 Paul Michael Stephani (1944–1998), American serial killer
 Paul Ivy Sterling (died 1880), British lawyer and Judge
 Paul Sterling (born 1964), English former professional rugby league footballer
 Paul Stern (1892–1948), Austrian international bridge player and lawyer, who fled to London in 1938
 Paul Stone (born 1968/1969), American businessman
 Paul Stookey (born 1937), American singer-songwriter
 Paul Storr (1770–1844), English goldsmith and silversmith
 Paul Strand (1890–1976), American photographer and filmmaker
 Paul Strand (baseball) (1893–1974), American professional baseball pitcher and outfielder
 Paul Strang (born 1970), Zimbabwean cricket coach and former international player
 Paul Street (director), British television commercial and film director
 Paul Sturgess (born 1987), British former professional basketball player
 Paul Sullivan (disambiguation), several people
 Paul Sutter, American astrophysicist
 Paul Taggart (born 1980), American photographer
 Paul Tang (politician) (born 1967), Dutch politician 
 Paul Tanner (disambiguation), several people
 Paul Taylor (disambiguation), several people
 Paul Teutul Jr. (born 1974), American reality television series American Chopper star
 Paul Teutul Sr. (born 1949), American founder of Orange County Choppers
 Paul Theriault (born 1950), Canadian former ice hockey coach
 Paul Thissen (born 1966), American politician and attorney
 Paul Thomas, several people
 Paul Thompson (disambiguation), several people
 Poul Thomsen (1922–1988), Danish film actor
 Paul Thomson (disambiguation), several people
 Paul Thorn (born 1964), American Southern rock, country, Americana, and blues singer-songwriter
 Paul Tobias (born 1963), American guitarist
 Paul F. Tompkins (born 1968), American comedian, actor, and writer
 Paul Toole (born 1970), Australian politician
 Paul E. Tracy, American criminologist and professor
 Paul Tracy (born 1968), Canadian-American former professional auto racing driver
 Paul Travis (1891–1975), American artist
 Paul Tseng, Chinese-American (Hakka Taiwanese) and Canadian applied mathematician who disappeared in 2012
 Paul Tsongas (1941–1997), American politician 
 Paul Tucker, several people
 Paul Twitchell (died 1971), American author and spiritual teacher
 Paul Tyler (born 1941), Liberal Democrat politician in the United Kingdom
 Paul Vachon (born 1937), Canadian professional wrestler
 Paul van Dyk (born 1971), German DJ, record producer and musician
 Paul Van Dyke (1859–1933), American historian and the brother of Henry Van Dyke
 Paul Varelans (1969–2021), American professional mixed martial artist
 Paul Van Himst (born 1943), Belgian footballer
 Paul van Ostaijen (1896–1928), Belgian poet and writer
 Paul Vario (1914–1988), American mobster and made man
 Paul Verhoeven (disambiguation), several people
 Paul Verlaine (1844–1896), French poet
 Paul Volcker (1927–2019), American economist
 Paul Völckers (1891–1946), German General of the Infantry in the Wehrmacht during World War II 
 Paul Volpe (mobster) (1927–1983), Italian-Canadian mobster
 Paul Volpe (poker player) (born 1981), American professional poker player
 Paul Wahlberg (born 1964), American chef, actor and a reality TV star
 Paul Waldman (born February 27, 1968), liberal/progressive American op-ed columnist and senior writer 
 Paul Walker (1973–2013), American actor
 Paul Wall (born 1981), American rapper and DJ
 Paul Walsh (disambiguation), several people
 Paul Walter (born 1994), English player for Essex County Cricket Club
 Paul Walters (1947–2006), BBC radio and TV producer
 Paul Walther (1927–2014), American basketball player
 Paul Waner (1903–1965), American professional baseball right fielder
 Paul Wanner (born 2005), Austrian professional footballer 
 Paul Washer (born 1961), American Protestant Christian evangelist 
 Paul Wasserman (1934–2007), American prominent entertainment publicist
 Paul Watson (disambiguation), several people
 Paul Joseph Watson (born 1982), British far-right YouTuber, radio host and conspiracy theorist
 Paul Webster (disambiguation), several people
 Paul Weitz (filmmaker) (born 1965), American screenwriter, director, and producer
 Paul Weller (disambiguation), several people
 Paul Wellstone (1944–2002), American academic, author, and politician 
 Paul von Werner (1707–1785), Chief of the Prussian Hussar Regiment No. 6
 Paul Wesley (born 1982), American actor
 Paul Westhead (born 1939), American Retired basketball coach
 Paul Westphal (1950–2021), American basketball player, head coach, and commentator
 Paul Weyrich (1942–2008), American religious conservative political activist and commentator
 Paul Whelan (security director) (born 1970), Canadian-born former United States Marine 
 Paul White, several people
 Paul Whitehouse (born 1958), Welsh comedian
 Paul Wieghardt (1897–1969), German-born American artist and professor
 Paul Wiggins (athlete) (born 1962), Australian wheelchair racer
 Paul Wight (born 1972), American wrestler known as "Big Show"
 Paul Wilbur (born 1951), American Christian musician, worship leader, and guitarist
 Paul Winchell (1922–2005), American ventriloquist, comedian, actor, voice artist, humanitarian, and inventor
 Paul Winfield (1939–2004), American stage, film and television actor
 Paul Junger Witt (1941–2018), American film and television producer
 Paul Wohl (1901–1985), German-born journalist and political commentator
 Paul Wolfowitz (born 1943), American political scientist and diplomat
 Paul Wong (artist) (born 1954), Canadian multimedia artist
 Paul Wong (musician) (born 1964), Hong Kong musician, singer, songwriter and record producer
 Paul Yakabuski (1922–1987), Canadian politician
 Paul (Yazigi), (born 1959), metropolitan of the archdiocese of Aleppo, Syria, of the Church of Antioch
 Paul Ygartua (born 1945), Canadian artist of British birth
 Paul Young (disambiguation), several people
 Paul N. Yu (1915–1991), American cardiologist, physician-scientist and educator
 Paul Yu (died 2016), Chinese-American academic
 Pat Zachry (born 1952), former professional baseball pitcher
 Paul Zaeske (1945–1992), American football player
 Paul Zammit (born 1941), Australian Liberal politician
 Paul Zammit (footballer) (born 1969), Maltese manager and a former footballer
 Paul Zanolini (1898–1989), American wrestler
 Paul Zaza (born 1952), Canadian Genie Award-winning film score and songwriter 
 Paul Zerdin (born 1972), British comedian and ventriloquist
 Paul Zimmer, internet personality
 Paul Zindel (1936–2003), American playwright, young adult novelist, and educator
 Paul Zipser (born 1994), German professional basketball player

Fictional characters
Paul, a character in the  1969 French romantic drama movie Love Is a Funny Thing
Paul, a character in the 1981 American slasher movie The Prowler
Paul, the main character in the 1984 Television Special The Care Bears Battle the Freeze Machine
Paul, a character in the 2000 American romantic comedy-drama movie High Fidelity
Paul, a character in the 2000 American comedy film The Photographer
Paul, a character in the 2003 American romantic comedy movie My Boss's Daughter
Paul, a character in the 2004 American science fiction disaster movie The Day After Tomorrow
Paul, a character in the 2013 coming-of-age movie Puppylove
Paul, a character in the Japanese anime series Pokémon anime and Diamond and Pearl
Paul, a character played by Samuel L. Jackson in the 2009 drama movie Mother and Child
Paul, a character in the British flash-animated web series Eddsworld
Paul, a character in the 1977 movie Pete's Dragon
Paul, the main character in the 2011 self titled movie
Dr. Paul Ashurst, a character in the British television crime drama Dalziel and Pascoe
Paul Atreides, a character in the Dune universe 
Paul Avery, a character from the 2011 film Knockout - Born to Fight
Paul Bates, a character in the 2011 fantasy comedy movie Midnight in Paris
Dr. Paul Bearer, a character host of 1973 TV horror movie series Creature Feature
Paul Blart, the main character from the 2009 film Paul Blart: Mall Cop and its 2015 sequel Paul Blart: Mall Cop 2
Mr. Paul Bracken, a character from the TV sitcom Herman's Head
Paul Buchman, the main character in the American television sitcom Mad About You
Paul Callan, the main character in the 2003 TV series Miracles
Paul Carey, a character from the 1980 American parody movie Airplane!
Paul Clayton and Paul Connor characters from the British ITV soap opera Coronation Street
Paul Coker and Paul Priestly, characters from the BBC soap opera, EastEnders
Paul Clough and Paul Collins, characters in the British television soap opera Brookside
Paul Cramer, a character from the ABC daytime soap opera One Life to Live
Paul Davenport, a character played by John Heard in the 1988 American fantasy comedy-drama movie Big
Sgt. Paul Davidson, a character played by Billy Dee Williams in the 2001 thriller movie Good Neighbor
Paul Drake (character), a fictional private detective in the Perry Mason novels and TV series
Paul Eastman, a character from the Ghost Whisperer
Paul Edgecombe, a character from the 1996 novel The Green Mile and the 1999 film of the same name
Paul Fisher, a character in the book Tangerine
Paul Forrester, the main character in the American science fiction Starman
Paul Freedman, a character in Halloween (1978), Halloween (2007)
Paul Gardner, a character in the 1998 slasher movie Urban Legend
Paul Germani, a character in the American crime drama television series The Sopranos
Paul Harris, a vampire from the 1987 American supernatural black comedy horror film The Lost Boys
Paul Haskel, a character played by Michael Beck in the 1990 TV movie Only One Survived
Paul Hennessy, a character played by John Ritter in the American sitcom television series 8 Simple Rules
Paul Holden, a character in the 1967 coming-of-age novel The Outsiders
Paul Hornsby, a character in the American daytime television soap opera General Hospital
Sgt. Paul Jackson, fictional US Marine in Call of Duty 4: Modern Warfare
Paul Kellerman, a character from the American television series, Prison Break
Paul Kinsey, a character in the American period drama television series television series Mad Men
Paul Kirby, a character in the 2001 American science fiction movie Jurassic Park III
Paul Krapence, a character in the American sitcom television series Cheers
Paul Krendler, a character in the  1991 American psychological horror movie The Silence of the Lambs
Paul Lahote, a character in the Twilight novel series Twilight Saga
Paul H. Lewis, a character from the 1931 film Iron Man
Paul Loomis, a character in the 2002 American supernatural horror movie They
Paul Maclean, a character played by Brad Pitt in the 1992 American drama movie A River Runs Through It
Paul Marin, a character in the 1980 American comedy movie Private Benjamin
Paul Marsden, a character from the British television soap opera Emmerdale
Paul Martin, a character on ABC soap opera All My Children (appeared 1970–1995)
Paul Martin, a character on the American television series Lassie 
Paul McClain and Paul Robinson, characters from the Australian television soap opera Neighbours
Paul Narita, a character from the NBC Daytime soap opera Days of Our Lives
Paul Joshua Pfeiffer, a character in the American coming-of-age, comedy-drama television series The Wonder Years
Paul Phoenix, a character from the Tekken franchise
Paul Ryan, a character on American daytime serial As the World Turns
Paul Sheldon, the main character in the 1990 American psychological thriller movie Misery
Paul Stark, the main character played by Jeffrey Tambor in the 1986 TV series Mr. Sunshine
Paul Sutton, a character played by Keanu Reeves in the 1995 American romantic drama movie A Walk in the Clouds
Paul Taylor, a character in the 1988 movie The Blob
Paul Torres, a character from the TV series The Following
Paul Truman, a character in the American TV sitcom Will & Grace
Paul Williams, a character on the American CBS soap opera The Young and the Restless
Paul Young, a character on ABC television series Desperate Housewives
Paul Zara, a character in the 2011 American political drama movie The Ides of March
Young Paul, character in the 1990 American crime thriller film movie The Grifters

See also
 
  – for people known as "Paul of ..."
 Jean-Paul (disambiguation)
 John Paul (disambiguation)
 John Paul Jones (disambiguation)
 Paavo
 Pablo
 Paolo
 Pauli
 Paull
 Paulo
 Paulus
 Paul-Antoine
 Paul (disambiguation)
 Paula (given name), feminine of Paul
 Paul (surname)
 Pavel
 Pavlos

References

English-language masculine given names
Dutch masculine given names
English masculine given names
Estonian masculine given names
French masculine given names
German masculine given names
Romanian masculine given names
Swedish masculine given names
Lists of people by given name